Message in a Bottle is the thirteenth studio album by Singaporean singer JJ Lin, released on 29 December 2017 by Warner Music Taiwan.

Track listing
All music produced by JJ Lin (except Destiny which was produced by Billy Koh (许环良).

References

2017 albums
JJ Lin albums